Conghalach mac Laidhgnen ua Gadhra, King of Gailenga, died 993.

Conghalach was a son of Laidhgnen ua Gadhra, who was in turn a grandson of Gadhra, from whom the surname O'Gara derived.

References

 The History of the County of Mayo to the Close of the Sixteenth Century. With illustrations and three maps, Hubert T. Knox. Originally published 1908, Hogges Figgies and Co. Dublin. Reprinted by De Burca rare books, 1982. .

External links
 http://www.ucc.ie/celt/published/T100005B/
 http://www.rootsweb.ancestry.com/~irlkik/ihm/connacht.htm#lui

10th-century Irish monarchs
People from County Mayo
993 deaths
Year of birth unknown